Eunoe hydroidopapillata is a scale worm described from off Kamchatka, North Pacific Ocean, at depths of 120 to 176m.

Description
elytra 15 pairs (assumed). Yellow ceratophores of all antennae; styles brownish up to expanded region; yellow or brown spots near cirrophores and elytrophores. Anterior margin of prostomium rounded. Lateral antennae inserted ventrally (beneath prostomium and median antenna). Notochaetae distinctly thicker than neurochaetae. Bidentate neurochaetae absent.

References

Phyllodocida
Animals described in 1999